Mutarara District is a district of Tete Province in western Mozambique.

Further reading
District profile (PDF)

Districts in Tete Province